The spectacled weaver (Ploceus ocularis) is a species of bird in the family Ploceidae. It is found widely in woodland, forest edge and gardens of central, eastern and south-eastern Africa, but is absent from the most arid regions (such as the Karoo) and dense, primary rainforest. This common species breeds in solitary pairs, and both sexes are bright yellow, have an olive-yellow back, black "spectacles" and pale eyes. The male has a black throat.

Gallery

References

 Craig 2010. Family Ploceidae. pp. 74–197 in: del Hoyo, Elliott and Christie, eds. 2010. Handbook of the Birds of the World. Vol. 15. Lynx Edicions, Barcelona.

External links
 Spectacled weaver -  Species text in Weaver Watch.
 Spectacled weaver - Species text in The Atlas of Southern African Birds.
Image at ADW

spectacled weaver
Birds of Sub-Saharan Africa
spectacled weaver
Taxonomy articles created by Polbot